Carried Away is the third album by Ooberman, released in August 2006 on the band's own Rotodisc label. It was recorded and produced by the band.

The album
The album was released soon after the band's reunion, and features several tracks recorded during the band's hiatus by various members of the band, as well as two which were released before the band's split. Falling Down was released on the Japanese issue of Hey Petrunko, and Lavender Blue was available as a download from the band's website in December 2002. An earlier version of Bong was featured on an "official bootleg" pressed by the band, and featured in their live set during their 2003 tour. 
Two of the tracks were taken from albums by Ooberman side-projects - Eye of the Storm from Ooberon's Waiting for the Sonic Boom and Twinkling Aurora from Symphonika's The Snow Queen.

Three singles were released from the album - a 7" of The Beauty of Your Soul, and download-only releases of Carried Away and Crashing Ellipticals.

The songs
Most of the songs on the album were written by Dan Popplewell - either alone or in collaboration with Sophia Churney. As on Hey Petrunko, Andy Flett has three sole writing credits. Bassist Steve Flett gets his first writing credit on an Ooberman album for Go To Sleep, for which he also provides lead vocals. The track is very similar in style to his work under the Phantom 309 name.

Track listing
 "Carried Away" (Popplewell/Churney)
 "Crashing Ellipticals" (A. Flett)
 "Mary Grows Old" (Popplewell/Churney) 
 "The Beauty of Your Soul" (Popplewell/Churney)
 "Lavender Blue" (Popplewell)
 "Easy" (A. Flett)
 "Eye Of The Storm" (A. Flett)
 "Twinkling Aurora" (Popplewell)
 "Far Far Away" (Popplewell/Churney) 
 "Bong" (Popplewell)
 "Falling Down" (Popplewell)
 "Go To Sleep" (S. Flett)

The album was also released in Japan on the Art Union label, with a new track - Rosie Mel - replacing Falling Down, which had already appeared on an earlier Japanese release. Provisional track listings of the Carried Away album included this, as well as a cover of "My Yidishe Mama", a song made popular in the early part of the 20th century by Sophie Tucker. The latter has not yet surfaced on any release.

External links 
 The Magic Treehouse – Ooberman fansite

2006 albums
Ooberman albums